The 2021–22 CSA 4-Day Series was a first-class cricket competition that took place in South Africa from October 2021 to March 2022. It was the first edition of the post-franchise era, and the first edition to return to a two-division league format. Domestic cricketing reforms were introduced in 2020 that discontinued the six franchise team format, and announced a return to the more traditional provincial based system. Fifteen teams, split over the two divisions, now compete in the 4-Day Series.

In Division 1, five of the six teams who competed in the 2020–21 CSA 4-Day Franchise Series opted to retain their franchise brand, with only the former Cape Cobras reverting to their traditional Western Province name. They were joined in Division 1 by Boland and North West. Matches featuring either Limpopo or Mpumalanga, both in Division 2, do not have first-class status. Dolphins are the defending champions.

In November 2021, in the Division 2 match between South Western Districts and Easterns, Sean Whitehead took all ten wickets in the second innings for South Western Districts, recording the second-best figures in a domestic first-class match in South Africa. Following positive tests for COVID-19, all of the Division 2 matches scheduled to start on 2 December 2021 were postponed. The next round of matches, all scheduled to start on 16 December 2021, were also postponed due to COVID-19 concerns.

The tournament came down to the final day, with the Titans taking the lead from the Warriors after victory in their match against the Lions, and ultimately securing the title as the Warriors' final match was rained out.

Points Table 
Division One

(C) Champion

Division Two

Fixtures

Division 1

Division 2

References

External links
 Series home at ESPN Cricinfo

South African domestic cricket competitions
CSA 4-Day Series
2021–22 South African cricket season